The Leitrim Fire Service  is the local authority fire and rescue service for County Leitrim, in Ireland. It is a branch of Leitrim County Council.

Fire stations 

There are currently 5 fire stations in Leitrim, all of which are retained stations.  There are stations in the towns of Carrick-on-Shannon, Mohill, Drumshanbo, Ballinamore, and Manorhamilton.

Appliances and equipment by station

Carrick On-Shannon 
1 x Water Tender Ladder
1 x Emergency Tender / Incident Control Unit
1 x Combined Aerial Rescue Platform
1 x Utility Vehicle

Mohill 
2 x Water Tender Ladder
1 x Utility Vehicle

Drumshanbo 
1 x Water Tender Ladder
1 x Utility Vehicle

Ballinamore 
1 x Water Tender Ladder
1 x Utility Vehicle

Manorhamilton 
1 x Water Tender Ladder
1 x Utility Vehicle

Spare 
1 x Water Tender Ladder

Ranks

See also
 Cork City Fire Brigade
 Garda Síochána
 HSE National Ambulance Service
 List of fire departments
 Civil Defence Ireland
 Irish Coast Guard

References

External links
Fire departments
Fire and rescue services in the Republic of Ireland
Emergency services in the Republic of Ireland